Baileyi may refer to:

Anostoma baileyi, a species of land snail
Bulbophyllum baileyi, a species of orchid
Gymnopilus baileyi, a species of mushroom
Ivesia baileyi, a species in the rose family
Mitromorpha baileyi, a species of sea snail
Oliva baileyi, a species of sea snail
Parnassius baileyi, a species of butterfly
Xenospiza baileyi, the Sierra Madre sparrow

See also
C. baileyi (disambiguation) 
D. baileyi (disambiguation) 
E. baileyi (disambiguation) 
N. baileyi (disambiguation) 
T. baileyi (disambiguation)